The Glenny Drive Apartments (also known as Kensington Heights or Kensington Towers) were a Buffalo, New York, public housing project built during the expansion of public housing in the United States in the 1950s.

History
The complex was finished in 1958 on the site of a former quarry, and consisted of six seven-story brick apartment buildings, each containing approximately 67 units. The housing complex was spread across 12 acres and located next to the Kensington Expressway (New York State Route 33) and behind Erie County Medical Center. The site was built by New York State using bonds and managed & maintained by the Buffalo Municipal Housing Authority. 

During the construction of the Kensington Expressway, any family displaced was given priority in the complex.

End of use
With reduced federal funding and increased operating and utility cost, maintenance of the buildings began to suffer and living conditions of the Glenny Drive Apartments began to decline. By the end of the 1970s, Kensington Heights had a vacancy rate of 64.7% (240 vacant units out of 371 available units). In 1980, a relocation plan was approved and the remaining residents were relocated. The site remained vacant for nearly three decades, becoming significantly deteriorated and vandalized in the process. Demolition began in 2009 but was quickly stopped after concerns about asbestos removal in the buildings. Demolition resumed in 2012. The Buffalo Municipal Housing Authority put the property for sale in July 2016 with one tower still standing. Erie County Medical Center purchased the property in 2017 and plan to use the site for parking. The last tower was demolished in October 2018.

See also
Cabrini–Green, Chicago, Illinois
Pruitt–Igoe, St. Louis, Missouri
List of public housing developments in the United States

References

Residential buildings completed in 1958
Public housing in the United States
Buildings and structures in Buffalo, New York
Urban decay in the United States